Balilla may refer to:
 Balilla, the nickname of Giovan Battista Perasso, a Genoese boy who started the revolt of 1746 against the Habsburg forces that occupied the city 
 Fiat Balilla, a compact car designed and developed by Fiat in 1932
 Italian submarine Balilla
 Balilla Lombardi, an Italian professional football player
 Opera Nazionale Balilla, an Italian Fascist youth organization functioning between 1926 and 1937
 Balilla-class submarine, the first submarines to be built for the Italian navy following the end of World War I.
 Francesco Balilla Pratella, an Italian composer, musicologist and essayist

See also
 Badilla (disambiguation)
 Barillas (disambiguation)